This is a list of Canadian Naval Reserve divisions, shore based reserve training facilities of the Royal Canadian Navy.

Christening bells
According to naval custom, the children of the ship's company baptized can also have their names inscribed on the ship's bell. The CFB Esquimalt Naval and Military Museum archive includes christening information from naval reserve divisions: HMCS Scotian; HMCS Queen Charlotte; HMCS Queen; HMCS Hunter; HMCS Hochelaga; HMCS Cataraqui; HMCS Hunter; HMCS Burlington.

References